Türk Edebiyatı (translated Turkish Literature) is a Turkish monthly literary magazine based in Turkey. The magazine was first published on 15 January 1972. The founder was Ahmet Kabaklı. Beşir Ayvazoğlu served as the editor-in-chief of the magazine between 2005 and 2015. He was succeeded by Bahtiyar Aslan in the aforementioned post in June 2015.

References

External links
 Türk Edebiyatı

1972 establishments in Turkey
Cultural magazines published in Turkey
Literary magazines published in Turkey
Magazines established in 1972
Monthly magazines published in Turkey
Turkish-language magazines
Magazines published in Istanbul